James or Jim Steffen may refer to:

 Jim Steffen (1936–2015), American football player 
 James F. Steffen, American ecologist